Carla Sozzani (born 1947) is an Italian book and magazine editor, gallerist and businesswoman. She founded Galleria Carla Sozzani in 1989 and is the creator of 10 Corso Como art/fashion establishment in Milan.

Early life and education

Sozzani was born in Mantua in 1947. She obtained a degree in Economy at Bocconi University in Milan. While attending University in the late 1960s/early 1970s, she began working as an editor for several Italian fashion magazines.

Career
During the following decade, Sozzani was editor-in-chief for all Italian Vogue'''s special issues working with photographers and artists Sarah Moon, Herb Ritts, Bruce Weber, Paolo Roversi, Robert Mapplethorpe, William Wegman and Deborah Turbeville.

In 1986, Sozzani left Italian Vogue and was appointed by Alexander Liberman as editor-at-large for American Vogue for Italy.

In 1987 Sozzani launched and edited the Italian edition of Elle. In 1989 Sozzani met American artist Kris Ruhs, and the two started a professional and personal relationship. In 1990 she founded Galleria Carla Sozzani at 10 Corso Como in Milan. 

The gallery mostly focused on photography, and published exhibition catalogues and books on the work of Walter Albini, Pierre Cardin, Rudi Gernreich, Paco Rabanne as well as many photographers. 

She subsequently oversaw more than 250 exhibitions of photography and design, showcasing the works of artists including Man Ray, Horst, Annie Leibovitz, Helmut Newton, David La Chapelle, Jean Prouvè, Marc Newson, Shiro Kuramata, Loretta Lux and Robert Polidori.

In 1991, Sozzani's gallery in 10 Corso Como was augmented by a fashion and design store, an expanded bookstore, a city garden café restaurant, a hotel named Three Rooms and a rooftop garden.

In 2001, Sozzani edited Talking to Myself, with Yohji Yamamoto, which she co-published with Steidl. She curated the photography exhibition at the MEP in Paris. In 2002, she opened 10 Corso Como Comme des Garçons in Tokyo, a co-venture store with Rei Kawakubo.

In 2008, in a joint venture with Samsung Group, she created 10 Corso Como in Seoul, a three-store location combining fashion, art, design and cuisine, designed by Kris Ruhs.

On 31 March 2012, 10 Corso Como opened its second location in Seoul - 10 Corso Como at Avenue L, also designed by Kris Ruhs.

In September 2013, Sozzani partnered with Trendy International Group to bring the 10 Corso Como concept to China. A new 10 Corso Como Shanghai opened in a free standing glass building with photography, fashion, design, music, cuisine with a pastry café and an outside terrace surrounded by plants.

In 2017, she established The Fondazione Sozzani. Committed to advancing the quality and aesthetic depth of contemporary life through an expansion of knowledge of the history, execution, use and presentation of both the applied and fine arts.

In Fall 2018 she opened a branch of 10 Corso Como in New York at South Street Seaport with Howard Hughes Corporation.

Personal life
Franca Sozzani (1950-2016), longtime editor-in-chief of Vogue Italia'', was her younger sister.

References 

Living people
1947 births
Italian women editors
Italian women journalists
Businesspeople from Mantua
Italian people of Russian descent
Elle (magazine) writers
Bocconi University alumni
Italian art dealers
20th-century Italian businesswomen
20th-century Italian businesspeople
21st-century Italian businesswomen
21st-century Italian businesspeople
Italian magazine editors
Fashion journalists
Fashion editors
Italian non-fiction writers
Vogue (magazine) people
Women magazine editors